Steleoceromys is a genus of flies in the family Stratiomyidae.

Species
Steleoceromys anthracina Grünberg, 1915
Steleoceromys procerus (Lindner, 1966)

References

Stratiomyidae
Brachycera genera
Taxa named by Karl Grünberg
Diptera of Asia